The Sorrow of Mrs. Schneider, also known as The Sadness of Mrs. Schneider or The Sadness of Mrs. Snajdrova is an Albanian-Czech romantic drama film directed by Piro Milkani and Eno Milkani. It is a movie of strong autobiographical elements and includes a three-nation cast: Albanian-Czech-Italian. It was released in 2008 and was the Albanian submission of the Academy Award for Best Foreign Language Film for that same year, but failed to be nominated.

Plot
It is 1961 and an Albanian student (Nik Xhelilaj) of the Academy of Performing Arts in Prague, together with a group of Czech students, is shooting his graduate movie on a motorcycle factory, in the small market-town of Český Šternberk, in then Czechoslovakia. Coming from a country that is completely isolated from the rest of Europe, he is fascinated by the lifestyle, society and "erotic exuberance" of the Czech golden youth, yet feeling strong links with his family in his homeland. He falls in love with a married woman (Anna Geislerová), the wife of a police superintendent (Paolo Buglioni) and is insecure about his future.

Cast
Nik Xhelilaj as Lekë Seriani
Anna Geislerová as Mrs. Snajderová
Tomáš Töpfer as Director Piskácek
Michele Placido as Count Jiri Sternberg
Arta Dobroshi as Ema
Paolo Buglioni as Mr. Snajder
Kamil Kollarik as Artur Zach
Violeta Manushi

References

External links
 

2008 films
2008 romantic drama films
Albanian-language films
2000s Czech-language films
Albanian drama films
Czech romantic drama films
2008 multilingual films
Czech multilingual films